Jesús Ortiz (born 17 April 1954) is a Cuban fencer. He competed in the individual and team sabre events at the 1980 Summer Olympics.

References

1954 births
Living people
Cuban male fencers
Olympic fencers of Cuba
Fencers at the 1980 Summer Olympics
Pan American Games medalists in fencing
Pan American Games gold medalists for Cuba
Fencers at the 1983 Pan American Games
Fencers at the 1987 Pan American Games
20th-century Cuban people
21st-century Cuban people